Occupation 101: Voice of the Silenced Majority is a 2006 documentary film on the Israeli–Palestinian conflict directed by Sufyan Omeish and Abdallah Omeish, and narrated by Alison Weir, founder of If Americans Knew. The film focuses on the effects of the Israeli occupation of the West Bank and Gaza Strip, and discusses events from the rise of Zionism to the Second Intifada and Israel's unilateral disengagement plan, presenting its perspective through dozens of interviews, questioning the nature of Israeli–American relations—in particular, the Israeli military occupation of the West Bank and Gaza, and the ethics of US monetary involvement. Occupation 101 includes interviews with mostly American and Israeli scholars, religious leaders, humanitarian workers, and NGO representatives—more than half of whom are Jewish—who are critical of the injustices and human rights abuses stemming from Israeli policy in the West Bank, East Jerusalem, and Gaza.

Cast
The entire list of featured interviews:
 Dr. Albert Aghazarian, Director of Public Relations at Birzeit University, Palestinian Armenian
 Ambassador James E. Akins, Former U.S. Ambassador to Saudi Arabia
 Rabbi Arik Ascherman, Rabbis for Human Rights (Israeli group)
 Dr. William Baker (theologian), Christians and Muslims for Peace
 Bishop Allen Bartlett, Jr., Diocese of Washington
 Phyllis Bennis, Institute for Policy Studies, and co-chair of the U.S. Campaign to End the Israeli Occupation
 Peter Boukaert, Director of Emergencies at Human Rights Watch
 Sharon Burke, Former Advocacy Director of Amnesty International
 Professor Noam Chomsky, linguist, MIT Professor.
 Father Drew Christiansen, United States Catholic Conference
 Cindy and Craig Corrie, parents of the late solidarity activist Rachel Corrie
 Douglas Dicks, Catholic Relief Services in Jerusalem, outreach program director
 Richard Falk, 2001 United Nations Fact-finding Commission in the West Bank and Gaza
 Paul Findley. U.S. Congressman, 1961–1983
 Thomas Getman, World Vision International
 Neta Golan, Israeli co-founder of International Solidarity Movement
 Jeff Halper, Israeli Committee Against House Demolitions
 Amira Hass, Israeli journalist, Haaretz
 Doug Hostetter, Fellowship of Reconciliation
 Kathy Kamphoefner, Christian Peacemaker Team
 Adam Keller, Gush Shalom, Israeli Peace Group
 Hava Keller, Woman's Organization for Political Prisoners (Israeli group)
 Professor Rashid Khalidi, School of International and Public Affairs, Columbia University
 Peretz Kidron, Israeli journalist, Yesh Gvul (Israeli peace group)
 Rabbi Michael Lerner, Founder & editor-in-chief of Tikkun magazine
 Rabbi Rebecca Lillian, Jewish Alliance for Justice and Peace
 Roger Normand, Center for Economic and Social Rights
 Allegra Pacheco, Israeli human rights lawyer
 Professor Ilan Pappe, Israeli historian – University of Haifa (now University of Exeter)
 Dr, Iyad Sarraj, Prominent Palestinian psychiatrist
 Yael Stein, B'Tselem, Israeli human rights group
 Gila Svirsky, Coalition of Women for a Just Peace, Israeli
 Ambassador Edward Walker, Former U.S. Ambassador to Israel
 Alison Weir, Founder of If Americans Knew

Awards
The film has won several awards from various film festivals.
 Winner of the "Golden Palm" Award (highest honor given by jury) and for "Best Editing" at the 2007 International Beverly Hills Film Festival.
 Winner of the 'Artivist Award' for Best Feature Film under the category of Human Rights at the 2006 Artivist Film Festival & Awards in Hollywood.
 Winner of the Best Documentary Award (Special Recognition) at the 2007 New Orleans International Human Rights Film Festival.
 Winner of the Best Feature Film Award at the 2006 River's Edge Film Festival.
 Winner of the Best Documentary Feature Award at 2006 The Dead Center Film Festival.
 Winner of the Audience Award for Best Documentary at 2006 East Lansing Film Festival.
 Winner of the John Michaels Memorial Award at the 2006 Big Muddy Film Festival.

References

External links
 
 Free Movie Broadcast in High-Definition
 
 Film review: "Occupation 101". Maureen Clare Murphy, The Electronic Intifada, Jun 27, 2007.
 Film Review: "Occupation 101". Nadia Naas Elkhatib, Institute for Middle East Understanding, Oct 19, 2006.
 "Film explores Israeli-Palestine conflict". By Gloria Er-Chua. October 19, 2007. The Queen's Journal.

2006 films
Documentary films about politics
American independent films
Documentary films about the Israeli–Palestinian conflict
2000s English-language films
2000s American films